The 1987 Challenge Cup was the 86th staging of rugby league's oldest knockout competition, the Challenge Cup. Known as the Silk Cut Challenge Cup for due to sponsorship from Silk Cut, the tournament featured clubs from the 1986-87 Rugby Football League season. It culminated in the final contested by Halifax and St. Helens at Wembley. Halifax won the match 19–18.

Preliminary round

First round

Second round

Quarter-finals

Semi final

Final

References

External links
Challenge Cup official website 
Challenge Cup 1986/87 results at Rugby League Project

Challenge Cup
Challenge Cup